Swizzling may refer to:
 Pointer swizzling – a computer science term.
 Swizzling (computer graphics) – a computer graphics term.
 Method swizzling
 Texture swizzling – in computer graphics, a way to store texture maps while respecting locality of reference.